"Dear God" is a song by English musician Elton John with lyrics by Gary Osborne. It's the sixth track on his 1980 album, 21 at 33. It is the shortest track on the album, and when released as a single, it failed to break any major charts. It did, however, reach No. 82 on the Australian singles chart.

It was originally intended to be released with only the one B-side, "Tactics", but the actual release came as a double-disc set, with the other disc being "Steal Away Child" and "Love So Cold". Two tracks were later used as b-sides for the Too Low For Zero and Breaking Hearts albums, and did not surface on a CD until the release of the 2020 box set Jewel Box where all three B-side tracks were included.

Charts

Personnel 
 Curt Becher – choir vocals
 Joe Chemay – choir vocals
 Clive Franks – tambourine
 Venette Gloud – backing vocals
 James Newton Howard – Fender Rhodes
 Elton John – lead vocals, backing vocals, acoustic piano, overdubbed piano
 Bruce Johnston – choir arrangements, choir vocals
 Jon Joyce – choir vocals
 Steve Lukather – electric guitar
 Reggie McBride – bass
 Peter Noone – choir vocals
 David Paich – organ
 Stephanie Spruill – backing vocals
 Alvin Taylor – drums
 Toni Tennille – choir vocals
 Carmen Twillie – backing vocals

References

Elton John songs
1980 singles
1980 songs
Songs with music by Elton John
Songs with lyrics by Gary Osborne
The Rocket Record Company singles